The Kulik River is a trans-boundary river that flows through the Indian states of  West Bengal and Bihar, and Bangladesh.

India 
In West Bengal, it goes through North Dinajpur district and has a bird sanctuary around it. In 2017, the river flooded resulting in the death of three people. The river has shrank due illegal dumping of waste and grabbing of land by the river. The government of West Bengal has been trying to revive the river.

Bangladesh 
It goes through Thakurgaon District in Bangladesh. The people of Thakurgaon have been demanding the government of Bangladesh build a bridge on Kulik River. The palace of Raja Tonkonath lies by the banks of Kulik River.

References

Rivers of India
Rivers of Bangladesh
West Bengal articles missing geocoordinate data
Chapai Nawabganj District
International rivers of Asia
Rivers of West Bengal
Rivers of Bihar
Rivers of Rajshahi Division